Yefim "Fima" Naumovich Bronfman (born April 10, 1958) is a Soviet-born Israeli-American pianist.

Biography
Bronfman was born in Tashkent, Uzbek SSR, and immigrated to Israel at the age of 15. He became an American citizen in 1989.

Bronfman's teachers were Rudolf Firkušný, Leon Fleisher, and Rudolf Serkin. He made his international debut in 1975 with Zubin Mehta and the Montreal Symphony Orchestra.

He made his Carnegie Hall debut in 1989 and gave a series of recitals with Isaac Stern in 1991. He won a Grammy award in 1997 for his recording of the three Bartók piano concertos with Esa-Pekka Salonen and the Los Angeles Philharmonic. Another recording with Salonen, of the concertos of Sergei Rachmaninoff, was pirated by the record label Concert Artist and re-issued with the piano part falsely attributed to Joyce Hatto.

Bronfman is also devoted to chamber music and has performed with many chamber ensembles and instrumentalists.

He made a set of Sergei Prokofiev's complete sonatas and concertos (with Zubin Mehta and the Israel Philharmonic Orchestra) for Sony Records.

In 1999, he appeared in Disney's Fantasia 2000, in a short clip introducing the "Steadfast Tin Soldier" segment. His rendition of Dmitri Shostakovich's Piano Concerto No. 2 in F major (1st movement) with the Chicago Symphony Orchestra is the music used for the segment.

In March, 2006, Bronfman performed Shostakovich's Piano Concerto No. 1 with the San Francisco Symphony conducted by Mstislav Rostropovich.

Bronfman has also made appearances with the Milwaukee Symphony Orchestra and the Orlando Philharmonic Orchestra, performing Beethoven's "Emperor" Concerto.

His recent appearances have included performances with the Orchestre de Paris and the Singapore Symphony Orchestra; Bronfman has also appeared as a Pennington Great Performers series artist with the Baton Rouge Symphony Orchestra in 2005 and again in 2007. In January 2007, he also premiered Esa-Pekka Salonen's Piano Concerto, of which he is the dedicatee, with the New York Philharmonic conducted by the composer. This was later followed by a European premiere at The Proms with the BBC Symphony Orchestra. In May 2008, Bronfman performed Johannes Brahms' Piano Concerto No. 1 with Michael Tilson Thomas and the San Francisco Symphony, during a three-week Brahms Festival. On September 3, 2008, Bronfman performed Piano Concerto No. 3 in D minor by Rachmaninoff under the direction of Michael Tilson Thomas at the Opening Gala of the San Francisco Symphony, and on September 28 and 29 with the St. Louis Symphony Orchestra, under the direction of David Robertson. On March 25 and 26, 2009, he performed it yet again, this time under the baton of Pinchas Zukerman with the National Arts Centre Orchestra in Ottawa, Ontario, Canada. Bronfman performed Brahms's Second Piano Concerto with the Houston Symphony Orchestra March 12–15, 2009, under the baton of Maestro Hans Graf, resident Music Director. In September 2021, he played Piano Concerto No. 3 in D minor by Rachmaninoff with the Rotterdam Philharmonic Orchestra, under the direction  of Maestro Lahav Shani at the George Enescu Festival in Bucharest.

Cultural references
In The Human Stain by Philip Roth, the narrator attends a rehearsal at Tanglewood at which Bronfman performs. The following description is offered (pages 209–10):Then Bronfman appears. Bronfman the brontosaur! Mr. Fortissimo. Enter Bronfman to play Prokofiev at such a pace and with such bravado as to knock my morbidity clear out of the ring. He is conspicuously massive through the upper torso, a force of nature camouflaged in a sweatshirt, somebody who has strolled into the Music Shed out of a circus where he is the strongman and who takes on the piano as a ridiculous challenge to the gargantuan strength he revels in. Yefim Bronfman looks less like the person who is going to play the piano than like the guy who should be moving it. I had never before seen anybody go at a piano like this sturdy little barrel of an unshaven Russian Jew. When he's finished, I thought, they'll have to throw the thing out. He crushes it. He doesn't let that piano conceal a thing. Whatever's in there is going to come out, and come out with its hands in the air. And when it does, everything there out in the open, the last of the last pulsation, he himself gets up and goes, leaving behind him our redemption. With a jaunty wave, he is suddenly gone, and though he takes all his fire off with him like no less a force than Prometheus, our own lives now seem inextinguishable. Nobody is dying, nobody—not if Bronfman has anything to say about it.

References

External links
Official website
More biographical information about Bronfman
Discography at SonyBMG Masterworks

1958 births
Living people
Uzbekistani emigrants to Israel
Grammy Award winners
American people of Uzbekistani-Jewish descent
Israeli classical pianists
Jewish American classical musicians
Jewish classical pianists
Male classical pianists
Uzbekistani Jews
Soviet Jews
Curtis Institute of Music alumni
21st-century classical pianists